The canton of Avesnes-sur-Helpe is an administrative division of the Nord department, northern France. It was created at the French canton reorganisation which came into effect in March 2015. Its seat is in Avesnes-sur-Helpe.

It consists of the following communes:

Avesnes-sur-Helpe
Beaudignies
Beaufort
Beaurepaire-sur-Sambre
Boulogne-sur-Helpe
Bousies
Cartignies
Croix-Caluyau
Dompierre-sur-Helpe
Dourlers
Éclaibes
Englefontaine
Étrœungt
Le Favril
Floursies
Floyon
Fontaine-au-Bois
Forest-en-Cambrésis
Ghissignies
Grand-Fayt
Haut-Lieu
Hautmont
Hecq
Jolimetz
Landrecies
Larouillies
Limont-Fontaine
Locquignol
Louvignies-Quesnoy
Marbaix
Maresches
Maroilles
Neuville-en-Avesnois
Orsinval
Petit-Fayt
Poix-du-Nord
Potelle
Preux-au-Bois
Prisches
Le Quesnoy
Raucourt-au-Bois
Robersart
Ruesnes
Saint-Aubin
Saint-Hilaire-sur-Helpe
Saint-Remy-du-Nord
Salesches
Semousies
Sepmeries
Taisnières-en-Thiérache
Vendegies-au-Bois
Villers-Pol

References

Cantons of Nord (French department)